Strawberry Thief may refer to:
Strawberry Thief (William Morris), textile design featuring thrushes
The Strawberry Thief, 2019 novel by Joanne Harris